Sviatoslav is a Russian and Ukrainian given name of Slavic origin. Cognates include Svetoslav, Svatoslav, Svetislav. It has a Pre-Christian pagan character and means "one who worships the light" (likely in reference to the sun).
A diminutive form for Sviatoslav is Svetlyo (Bulgarian), Slava (Russian),  (Polish), Slavik (Ukrainian). Its feminine form is Sviatoslava. The name may refer to:

People

Monarchs
Sviatoslav I of Kiev (c. 942 – 972), emperor of Rus
Sviatoslav II of Kiev (1027–1076), prince of Kiev and Chernigov
Sviatoslav III of Kiev (before 1141–1194), prince of Turov (1142 and 1154), Vladimir and Volyn (1141–1146), Pinsk (1154), Novgorod-Seversky (1157–1164), Chernigov (1164–1177), Grand Prince of Kiev (1174, 1177–1180, 1182–1194)
Sviatoslav Olgovich (before 1108–1164), prince of Novgorod-Severski (1136–1138, 1139), Belgorod (1141–1154) and Chernigov (1154–1164)
Sviatoslav III of Vladimir (1196–1252), prince of Vladimir and Novgorod

Sports
Svyatoslav Syrota (born 1970), Ukrainian sport administrator and former player

Other
 Svyatoslav Fyodorov (1927–2000), Russian ophthalmologist
 Sviatoslav Piskun (born 1959), Ukrainian statesman
 Sviatoslav Richter (1915–1997), Russian pianist
 Svyatoslav Vakarchuk (born 1975), Ukrainian singer
 Sviatoslav Shevchuk (born 1970), Ukrainian Catholic Patriarchate of Kyiv

See also
 Slavic names

Slavic masculine given names
Russian masculine given names
Ukrainian masculine given names